Kotak Mahindra Life Insurance Company Limited is a private life insurance company in India. The company was founded in 2001. It provides insurance to 45.4 million customers and has 287 branches in around 148 cities and towns in India with 73,000 agents.

The company offers various protection, retirement, savings, investment, and annuity plans.

Corporate history
The Kotak Mahindra Group was founded in 1985 as a provider of financial services. In February 2003, Kotak Mahindra Finance Ltd (KMFL), the Group's flagship company, received banking license from the Reserve Bank of India (RBI) to conduct banking operations in the country and was renamed as Kotak Mahindra Bank, the parent company of Kotak Life Insurance. The company started operations in 2001 on a 74:26 joint venture between Kotak Mahindra Bank Ltd and Old Mutual Plc. In 2017, Kotak Mahindra Bank bought Old Mutual's 26 percent stake in the life insurance joint venture for Rs 1,293 crore, subject to approvals, making the life insurance company fully owned by Kotak Mahindra Group.

Products and services
Kotak Life Insurance's products include rural plans, term plans, savings, children, retirement, and investment plans at nominal premium rates to be affordable by individual investment requirements that can cater to their lifetime requirements, and each insurance plan is designed to provide maximum protection in addition to benefits and to keep in mind the different sections of society. To facilitate the sale of its products the company has a network of branch offices distributed across the country, individual agents, insurance agencies and offices, and individual and firm brokers for claim settlements and these products are also available online through aggregators and the company website. 

In 2019, Kotak Life Insurance and Instantpay collaborated to introduce insurance to first-time consumers and digitally empower society's semi-urban sections on various insurance products. As per the agreement, the latter will use its vast network of more than 1 lakh merchants to introduce Kotak Life Insurance's products through its InstantPay portal or app, which currently has an annual premium as low as Rs 200.

In 2020, the company launched Kotak Health Shield, providing benefits like daily hospitalisation cash benefit, waiver of premium on being diagnosed with minor conditions, and income benefit on being diagnosed with major illnesses and forayed into the comprehensive health insurance segment.

In 2023, Kotak Life Insurance launched a short-term insurance product, Kotak Protect India, which was targeted at adult customers below 35 years of age. The product has a coverage term ranging from 1 year to 5 years.

The company currently has 49 products including 19 group products and 30 retail products, and additionally offers 19 rider options (as on March 2023). As on Feb 2023, it had more than 280 branches in around 148 cities in India and more than 73,000 advisors.￼

Financials
As of March 2019, the market share of Kotak Life Insurance increased by 1.6%. The company garnered a total premium of Rs. 8132 crores. The company assets under management of Rs. 25,936 crores as on 31 March 2019.

Major landmarks

Some of the major landmarks of the company from the date of its inception are:

2017- Became a 100% owned entity after Kotak Bank bought out the minority share of Old Mutual plc.

2014- Total assets under management (AUM) stood at Rs 12,104 crore (US$ 1.93 billion) by the end of March 31, 2014.

2013- Total assets under management (AUM) stood at Rs 10,964 crore (US$ 1.75 billion) by the end of March 31, 2013.

2010- Launching its e-insurance portal.

2009- Reports 39 percent growth in gross premium for the financial year 2008-09.

See also 
 Kotak Mahindra Bank

References 

Life insurance companies of India
Financial services companies based in Mumbai
Financial services companies established in 2001
Kotak Mahindra Bank
2001 establishments in Maharashtra
Indian companies established in 2001